December 23 - Eastern Orthodox liturgical calendar - December 25

All fixed commemorations below celebrated on January 6 by Eastern Orthodox Churches on the Old Calendar.

For December 24th, Orthodox Churches on the Old Calendar commemorate the Saints listed on December 11.

Feasts
 The Eve of the Nativity of Christ.

Saints
 Venerable Nun-martyr Eugenia of Rome, and with her:
 Martyrs Philip (her father), Protus and Hyacinth (Jacinth), Basilla, and Claudia (262)
 Martyrs Sossios and Theokleios (c. 286-305).
 Martyr Castulus (c. 307-323)
 Martyr Achaicus, by the sword.
 Venerable Vitimionus of Scetis (Bitimionus of Scete) (5th century)
 Venerable Aphrodisius, monk of Palestine (6th century)
 Venerable Antiochus of Palestine (Antiochus Strategos, Antiochos Sabbaitis), monk of the Great Lavra of St. Sabbas the Sanctified in Jerusalem (635)
 Venerable Nicholas the Monk, of Bulgaria (Nicholas the former soldier) (c. 802-811)

Pre-Schism Western saints
 Martyrs Lucian, Metrobius, Paul, Zenobius, Theotimus and Drusus, in Tripoli in North Africa.
 Hieromartyr Gregory of Spoleto, a priest martyred in Spoleto in Italy under Maximinian Herculeus.
 Saint Delphinus, Bishop of Bordeaux in France; he helped convert St Paulinus of Nola and was an untiring opponent of Priscillianism (404)
 Saint Venerandus,  born of a senatorial family in Clermont in Auvergne in France, he became bishop there from 385-423 (423)
 Saint Caranus (Carannus), a saint of the east of Scotland.
 Saint Tarsila, an aunt of St Gregory the Great, sister of St Emiliana and niece of Pope Felix; she led a life of seclusion and asceticism in her paternal home (581)
 Saint Mochua, Abbot of Timahoe (637)
 Saint Irmina, sister of St. Adela, daughter of Dagobert II (King of the Franks) (708)
 Saint Adela, daughter of Dagobert II (King of the Franks), first Abbess of Pfalzel near Trier in Germany (c. 730)
 Saint Alberic (Albert), a monk at Gladbach Abbey in Germany (10th century)
 Saint Bruno, a holy man at the monastery of Ottobeuren Abbey in Bavaria in Germany (1050)

Post-Schism Orthodox saints
 New Martyr Achmed (Ahmet) the Calligrapher, at Constantinople (1682) (see also May 3 ) 
 Venerable Agapios the Younger (1812).

New martyrs and confessors
 New Hieromartyr Innocent (Beda), Archimandrite, of Voronezh (Innokenty (Bida) of Poltava) (1928)
 New Hieromartyr Sergius Mechev, Archpriest, of Moscow (1942)

Icon gallery

Notes

References

Sources
 December 24/January 6. Orthodox Calendar (PRAVOSLAVIE.RU).
 January 6 / December 24. HOLY TRINITY RUSSIAN ORTHODOX CHURCH (A parish of the Patriarchate of Moscow).
 December 24. OCA - The Lives of the Saints.
 The Autonomous Orthodox Metropolia of Western Europe and the Americas (ROCOR). St. Hilarion Calendar of Saints for the year of our Lord 2004. St. Hilarion Press (Austin, TX). p. 2.
 December 24. Latin Saints of the Orthodox Patriarchate of Rome.
 The Roman Martyrology. Transl. by the Archbishop of Baltimore. Last Edition, According to the Copy Printed at Rome in 1914. Revised Edition, with the Imprimatur of His Eminence Cardinal Gibbons. Baltimore: John Murphy Company, 1916.
Greek Sources
 Great Synaxaristes:  24 ΔΕΚΕΜΒΡΙΟΥ. ΜΕΓΑΣ ΣΥΝΑΞΑΡΙΣΤΗΣ.
  Συναξαριστής. 24 Δεκεμβρίου. ECCLESIA.GR. (H ΕΚΚΛΗΣΙΑ ΤΗΣ ΕΛΛΑΔΟΣ). 
Russian Sources
  6 января (24 декабря). Православная Энциклопедия под редакцией Патриарха Московского и всея Руси Кирилла (электронная версия). (Orthodox Encyclopedia - Pravenc.ru).
  24 декабря (ст.ст.) 6 января 2013 (нов. ст.). Русская Православная Церковь Отдел внешних церковных связей. (DECR).

December in the Eastern Orthodox calendar